Damarcherla, alternatively spelled Damaracherla or Damercherla, is a mandal in Nalgonda district in the state of Telangana in southern India. Damercherla is considered the head city of the mandal.

Geography

Damarcherla has a total area of 4,649 hectares. The postal head office is Wadapally.

Damarcherla sits on the border of the districts of Nalgonda in Telangana and Palnadu in Andhra Pradesh. Damarcherla is surrounded by the mandals of Miryalaguda and Nereducherla towards the north, and the Andhra Pradesh mandals of Dachepalle and Gurazala to the south.

Nearby cities
Miryalaguda – 17 km
Macherla – 39 km
Suryapet – 50 km
Kodad – 52 km
Nalgonda (district headquarters in Nalgonda) – 67 km
Hyderabad (capital city of Telangana) – 143 km

Nearby villages
Thalla Veerappa Gudem – 6 km
Narsapur – 6 km
Kondrapole – 8 km
Bette Thanda – 8 km
Balaji Nagarthanda – 9 km

Population 

The local language is Telugu.

The total population of the mandal is 66,946 people who live in 13,377 houses, spread across a total of 90 villages and 24 panchayats. There are approximately 34,519 men and 32,427 women living in the mandal.

Landmarks

Temples 
Mutylamma Temple
Kanaka Durga Temple
Kanyaka Parameswari Temple
Sri Lakshmi Narasimha Swamy Temple – Wazirabad, 5.7 km from Damarcherla
Krishna Musi River Samgamam – Vadapally, 6.3 km  from Damarcherla

Schools and colleges 
Raasi DAV High School – Vadapally, Telangana
Nobel Concept School
Shantiniketan E/M High School
Prathibha Vidyalayam High school
Kgbv Dameracharla
Nagarjuna High School
Sri Vidyanikethan High Sc
Sri Krishna Junior College
Aptwrs Jr College For Girls

Infrastructure

Transport 
There are many railway stations located in the surrounding region. The Guntur Junction Railway Station is the divisional railway station. There are also railway stations in Vishnupuram and Miryalaguda. The Halt Railway station is in Kondrapole. 

Telangana State Road Transport Corporation (TSRTC) and Andhra Pradesh State Road Transport Corporation (APSRTC) operate buses in the region.

Airports near Damarcharla include:
Vijayawada Airport – 140 km
Rajiv Gandhi International Airport – 157 km
Rajahmundry Airport – 264 km
Tirupati Airport – 385 km

Yadadri Power Plant 
Yadadri Thermal Power Plant is a project near Veerlapalem village in the mandal. Telangana State Power Generation Corporation Limited (TSGENCO) awarded the contract to build the facility to Bharat Heavy Electricals Limited.

The scope of the contract included the design, supply, erection and commissioning of the Yadadri 5 x 800 MW Thermal Power Station. Project completion was proposed to be achieved within 48 months from its start date of June 2015.

Proposed dry port 
The government proposed spending  to set up four dry ports around Hyderabad. Sources in infrastructure and investment said that the dry ports were proposed at Damarcherla along the Miryalaguda–Wadapally highway (3,000 acres), Bhongir along NH-163 (450 acres), Jadcherla along NH-7 (319 acres), and Zaheerabad along NH-9 (825 acres).

References

 Mandal headquarters in Nalgonda district